The Johnston Police Department is the primary law enforcement agency in the town of Johnston, Rhode Island. The town has a population of about 29,000. The department is headed by Richard S. Tamburini. It is headquartered at 1651 Atwood Avenue.

History
The town was established in 1759. In 1874, Samuel A. Irons was appointed as the first commissioner of police. Hiram Kimball served as police chief from 1898 to 1934. His only policeman was his son. By the 1930s, the department had grown to a total of six, including the police chief Chester Colwell.

Organization
The Investigative Division includes the Detective Bureau, the Bureau of Criminal Identification, the Prosecution Bureau, the Juvenile Bureau and the Narcotics Bureau.

The Uniformed Division is led by a major. Most of the department's workers are assigned to this division.

The Traffic/Special Services Bureau has six people assigned, including the commander in the rank of captain.

The Operations & Training Division is headed by a captain and a total of nine sworn and support personnel.

Equipment
The department has taken advantage of various federal programs that provide equipment to local police. In the 2010-11 fiscal year it received $4.1 million in assistance including 30 assault rifles, 44 bayonets, 12 Humvees and other items.

Slain officers
No members of this department have been killed in the line of duty.

Misconduct
In October 2008, Detective Marc Zaccagnini pleaded no contest to charges of trespass and vandalism.  More serious charges were dropped to obtain this plea. He was sentenced to a five-year deferred sentence and community service. He was terminated by the police department on 1 November 2007. He sued the department.  The court quickly ruled against him.
In May 2008, Zaccagnini violated the terms of his release when he was convicted of simple assault in an unrelated matter and was sentenced to sixty days in jail. He was also ordered to serve an additional ten months on the previous trespass charge.

In March 2014, Officer Marisa Ciccone plead guilty to charges related to a violent off-duty rampage. She was sentenced to a year of probation and ordered to undergo drug abuse counseling.

References

Johnston, Rhode Island
Municipal police departments of Rhode Island